Trapp Lake is a settlement in British Columbia.

Settlements in British Columbia
Populated places in the Thompson-Nicola Regional District